Events in the year 1984 in Cyprus.

Incumbents 

 President: Demetris Christofias
 President of the Parliament: Yiannakis Omirou

Events 
Ongoing – Cyprus dispute

 14 December – U.N. Security Council resolution 559 was adopted unanimously.

Deaths

References 

 
1980s in Cyprus
Years of the 21st century in Cyprus
Cyprus
Cyprus
Cyprus